Alfie Ben May (born 2 July 1993) is an English professional footballer who plays as a striker for Cheltenham Town.

Career

Early career
Born in Gravesend, May began his career in the youth team at Millwall where he stayed from age nine until 14, being released due to his size. He began his senior career with Corinthian, then Billericay Town and Chatham Town, before joining Bromley on a dual-registration basis in January 2014. After a spell with VCD Athletic, May signed for Erith & Belvedere in August 2014. After a trial at League One club Crewe Alexandra in September 2014, May signed for Farnborough in October 2014. He left the club after just two weeks. After returning to previous club Erith & Belvedere, he moved to Hythe Town in October 2015. In September 2016 his manager said he was good enough to play in the Football League, and he had a trial with League Two club Stevenage in October 2016.

Doncaster Rovers
After the club made an approach for him, May turned professional with Doncaster Rovers (also in League Two) in January 2017, signing a -year contract. He scored his first professional goal on 18 February 2017, in a 1–1 home draw with Luton Town.

Cheltenham Town
On 3 January 2020, May signed for Cheltenham Town on a two-and-a-half-year contract for an undisclosed fee. On 19 February 2022, May scored four goals against Wycombe Wanderers in a match that would end 5-5; May scored the equalising goal to share the points.  May was awarded the EFL League One Player of the Month award for February 2022 after scoring eight goals in six matches across the month, including the four goals against Wycombe.

Career statistics

Honours
Cheltenham Town
 League Two: 2020–21

Individual
 EFL League One Player of the Month: February 2022
 Cheltenham Town Players' Player of the Year: 2021–22
 Cheltenham Town Supporters' Player of the Year: 2021–22

References

1993 births
Living people
English footballers
Footballers from Kent
Association football forwards
Billericay Town F.C. players
Corinthian F.C. (Kent) players
Chatham Town F.C. players
Bromley F.C. players
VCD Athletic F.C. players
Erith & Belvedere F.C. players
Farnborough F.C. players
Hythe Town F.C. players
Doncaster Rovers F.C. players
Cheltenham Town F.C. players
English Football League players
National League (English football) players
Isthmian League players
Millwall F.C. players